High Stakes is the thirty-fourth album by American singer-songwriter Michael Martin Murphey, released on April 22, 2016.

Track listing
 "High Stakes" – Michael Martin Murphey
 "Campfire on the Road" – John Robert Williamson
 "Running Gun" – Jim Glaser
 "Emila Farewell" – Michael Martin Murphey
 "Master's Call" – Marty Robbins
 "The Drover Road to Amulree" – David John Wilkie
 "The Betrayal of Johnnie Armstrong" – David John Wilkie
 "Three Sons" – John Robert Williamson
 "I've Got the Guns" – Roger William Creager
 "Honor Bound" – Michael Martin Murphey
 "The End of The Road" – Michael Martin Murphey

Credits

Music
 Michael Martin Murphey – vocals, acoustic guitar, banjo
 Ryan Murphey – acoustic guitar, mandolin, background vocals
 Chris Leuzinger – electric guitar, acoustic guitar
 Tim Lauer – keyboards
 Jonathan Yudkin – fiddle, cello, bouzouki
 David Coe – fiddle
 Al Perkins – steel guitar
 Pat Flynn – acoustic guitar, 12-string guitar
 Jim Hoke – accordion
 Matt Pierson – electric and acoustic bass

Production
 Michael Martin Murphey – executive producer
 Bobby Blazier – producer
 Jeremy Hunter – engineer
 Brennan – album design

References

External links
 Michael Martin Murphey's Official Website

2016 albums
Bluegrass albums
Michael Martin Murphey albums
Western music (North America) albums